Écoute voir  is a 1979 French drama-thriller film directed by Hugo Santiago from a screenplay by Santiago and Claude Ollier. It stars Catherine Deneuve, Sami Frey, and Anne Parillaud.

Synopsis
Arnaud de Maule, young lord of the manor, distinguished scholar, has resort to the detective Claude Alphand (Catherine Deneuve), so that she might make enquiries into some individuals who are getting into his estate in Yvelines. Claude discovers  that it is a question of the members of a strange sect, the Church of the Final Revival, which has recently won over Chloé, the young mistress of Arnaud.

Cast
 Catherine Deneuve : Claude Alphand
 Sami Frey : Arnaud de Maule
 Florence Delay : Flora Thibaud
 Anne Parillaud : Chloé/Moune
 Didier Haudepin : Claude's secretary
 Antoine Vitez : delegate of the sect
 Jean-François Stévenin : Inspector Mercier
 François Dyrek : Inspector Daloup

External links
 

1970s French-language films
French detective films
Films directed by Hugo Santiago
1979 films
1970s thriller films
1970s French films